Polygrammodes ephremalis is a moth in the family Crambidae. It was described by Schaus in 1927. It is found in the Philippines (Mindanao, Luzon).

References

Spilomelinae
Moths described in 1927
Moths of Asia